Di Giorgi is a surname.

List of people with the surname 

 Giácomo Di Giorgi (born 1981), Venezuelan footballer
 Rosa Maria Di Giorgi (born 1955), Italian politician

See also 

 Giorgi (surname)
 Di Giorgio

Surnames
Surnames of Italian origin
Italian-language surnames
Patronymic surnames
Surnames from given names